Forever Fabulous is a 1999 comedy starring Jean Smart, Jennifer Elise Cox, Robert Wagner, Emily Proctor and Jorja Fox, which was written and directed by Werner Molinsky and initially screened under the title Tiara Tango at the 1999 Austin Film Festival. In 2001, the film began airing on the Lifetime Movie Network, where it aired periodically until early 2004.

Plot
Loreli Daly is an over the hill beauty queen who left her home in Texas following a scandal and has spent recent years overseeing beauty pageants and living vicariously through her current beauty queen daughter, Corinne.  On the day that Corrine graduates from beauty school, she discovers a crumpled piece of paper in the trash, asking Loreli to return to the Lonestar state to oversee the Miss Texas Tiara Quest competition.  Desperate to ditch her mother and head off to Hollywood, Corrine enlists the help of her childhood friends, conniving reporter Tiffany Dawl and prison guard Liz Guild, to encourage Loreli to return to Texas so the girls can compete in one final pageant—and Tiffany plans to shoot footage of their trip for use in a beauty queen documentary for The Learning Channel.  With further encouragement from her longtime boyfriend Lyle, Loreli agrees to the trip, and they all pack up in Lyle's Winnebago and hit the road.  Soon after embarking on their trip, a freak mishap results in death, and the characters find themselves in a constant struggle to get back to Texas.

Cast
Jean Smart as Loreli Daly
Jennifer Elise Cox as Corrine Daly
Robert Wagner as Lyle Devereaux Green
Emily Procter as Tiffany Dawl
Jorja Fox as Liz Guild
Mink Stole as Miss Vi Ambrose
Jack Plotnick as Adam
Fred Dennis as Stan Watts
Clay Adkins as Miss Trixie Ballou

References

External links
 Official Site

1999 films
1990s parody films
American parody films
Films about beauty pageants
Films set in Texas
1999 comedy films
1990s English-language films
1990s American films